KJMS (101.1 FM) is an urban adult contemporary radio station in Memphis Tennessee, and serving the Mid-South, area, owned by iHeartMedia, Inc.  The station's studios are located in southeast Memphis, and the transmitter site is in north Memphis.

KJMS broadcasts in HD.

History

KLYX and KWAM-FM
KWAM, Incorporated, filed a construction permit for a new FM radio station in Memphis on September 12, 1963. The Federal Communications Commission approved the application on January 24, 1964. The station took the call letters KLYX before signing on March 10, 1965. After four years, the call letters were changed to KWAM-FM. (While the station has always been licensed east of the Mississippi River, KWAM had been founded in West Memphis, Arkansas.)

KRNB as Majic 101 
On January 4, 1982, KWAM flipped to an CHR/urban contemporary ("churban") as "Majic 101". The station was the fourth urban outlet in the Memphis market, competing with WHRK. Soon changing its call letters to KRNB, the new station made an immediate impact on the market, moving from dead last to an 11 share. In 1990, the station rebranded as KHUL "Cool 101", an urban adult contemporary outlet.

As KJMS 
In 1991, the KRNB calls would be dropped for KJMS as "K-Jams", going head to head with WHRK for the mainstream urban audience. KRNB continued to rate respectably, though it never beat WHRK.

In 1996, Ragan Henry's U.S. Radio acquired KWAM and KJMS from the Dee Rivers Group for $12.5 million, as U.S. Radio itself was in the process of being purchased by Clear Channel. The purchase brought WHRK and KJMS under common ownership and prompted KJMS to shift to urban adult contemporary.

Until January 2019, KJMS aired the Tom Joyner morning show. He was replaced with a local morning show featuring Mike Evans, Earle Augustus, and Stormy Taylor.

References

External links
 KJMS official website
 

Urban adult contemporary radio stations in the United States
KJMS
Radio stations established in 1965
1965 establishments in Tennessee
IHeartMedia radio stations